The Temple of Augustus is a well-preserved Roman temple in the city of Pula, Croatia (known in Roman times as Pietas Iulia). Dedicated to the first Roman emperor, Augustus, it was probably built during the emperor's lifetime at some point between 27 BC and his death in AD 14. The richly decorated frieze is similar to that of a somewhat larger and more recent temple, the Maison Carrée in Nîmes, France. These two temples are considered the two best complete Roman monuments outside Italy.

History
The temple was part of a triad consisting of three temples. The Temple of Augustus stood at the left side of the central temple, and the similar temple of the goddess Diana stood on the other side of the main temple. Although the larger central temple has not survived, the whole back side of the Temple of Diana is still clearly visible due to its incorporation into the Communal Palace, built in 1296.

If still in use by the 4th-century, the temple would have been closed during the persecution of pagans in the late Roman Empire. Under Byzantine rule, the temple was converted into a church, accounting for its survival to modern times, and was later used as a granary.

In the 16th century, Andrea Palladio included the description of the temple in his I quattro libri dell'architettura, a highly influential book on the principles of Classical architecture.

By the late 19th century, the temple stood at the corner of the marketplace of Pula and was partly concealed by houses, "so that the visitor cannot obtain a view till he is close to it."

It was struck by a bomb during an Allied air raid in 1944, almost totally destroying it, but was reconstructed in 1947. It is today used as a lapidarium to display items of Roman sculpture.

Dedication
The temple's dedication originally consisted of bronze letters affixed by nails to the stones of the architrave. Only the attachment holes now remain and much of the text has been destroyed over time. However, it consisted of a standard dedication also found on other Augustan temples, which read:
ROMAE · ET · AVGVSTO · CAESARI · DIVI · F · PATRI · PATRIAE
To Roma and Augustus Caesar, son of the deity, father of the fatherland
or 
In honour of Rome and Augustus Caesar, son of the deified [Julius], father of his country.

This indicates that the temple was originally also co-dedicated to the goddess Roma, the personification of the city of Rome. Unlike later temples, such as the Temple of Divus Augustus in Rome, the temple was not dedicated to divus (the deified) Augustus - a title only given to the emperor after his death. This, the title Pater Patriae that was voted to Augustus in 2 BC., and the temple's architectural style, have allowed archaeologists to date the temple to the late Augustan period, prior to Augustus' death in AD 14.

Gallery

See also
 List of Ancient Roman temples
 Pula Arena
 Temple of Augustus in Barcelona
 Monumentum Ancyranum
 Temple of Divus Augustus

References
notes

references

Bibliography

External links

1st-century Roman temples
Archaeological sites in Croatia
Ancient Roman buildings and structures in Croatia
Buildings and structures in Pula
Temples in Croatia
Pula
Tourist attractions in Pula